Universe 3 may refer to:

 Universe 3 (anthology), a 1973 science-fiction anthology
 Universe 3 (video game), a 1989 video game
 Dance Dance Revolution Universe 3, a 2008 video game